La poliziotta fa carriera, internationally released as Confessions of a Lady Cop, is a 1976 commedia sexy all'italiana directed by Michele Massimo Tarantini. It is an unofficial sequel of Steno's La poliziotta in which sex and nudity become more explicit, and at the same time it is a parody of the poliziottesco film genre.  The film had two sequels, all starred by Edwige Fenech and directed by Tarantini, A Policewoman on the Porno Squad (La poliziotta della squadra del buon costume, 1979), and A Policewoman in New York (La poliziotta a New York, 1981).

Cast 
 Edwige Fenech: Gianna Amicucci
 Gigi Ballista: Questore Moretti
 Alvaro Vitali: Agente Tarallo 
 Mario Carotenuto: Commissario Antinori
 Gianfranco D'Angelo: Onorevole Mannello
 Michele Gammino: Cecè 
 Giuseppe Pambieri:  Dr. Alberto Moretti
 Riccardo Garrone: Federico Innocenti  
 Francesco Mulè: Alfredo Amicucci
 Gastone Pescucci: Tonino er mammola
 Nello Pazzafini: Mojefuma
 Gino Pagnani: Cecè's Friend
 Fortunato Arena: the man who falls into the fountain

See also 
 List of Italian films of 1976

References

External links

1976 films
Commedia sexy all'italiana
Poliziotta films
1970s police comedy films
1970s sex comedy films
Films directed by Michele Massimo Tarantini
Unofficial sequel films
1976 comedy films
1970s Italian-language films
1970s Italian films